Albert John Babartsky (April 19, 1915 – December 29, 2002) was a professional American football offensive tackle who played in the National Football League for six seasons for the Chicago Cardinals and the Chicago Bears. He was a member of the Seven Blocks of Granite at Fordham University.

External links

1915 births
2002 deaths
People from Shenandoah, Pennsylvania
Players of American football from Pennsylvania
American football tackles
Fordham Rams football players
Chicago Cardinals players
Chicago Bears players